Denis Langlois (born in Longueuil, Quebec) is a Canadian director, screenwriter, producer, actor and editor from Quebec. He is most noted for his feature films Danny in the Sky, Amnesia: The James Brighton Enigma (Amnésie, l'énigme James Brighton) and A Paradise Too Far (Y’est où le paradis?).

Biography 
Denis Langlois received a diploma from the Concordia University film program. In 1994, with Bertrand Lachance, he founded a company called Castor & Pollux Productions.

As director 
 1992 : My Life (Ma vie)
 1996 : The Escort (L'escorte)
 2001 : Danny in the Sky
 2005 : Amnesia: The James Brighton Enigma (Amnésie, l'énigme James Brighton)
 2017 : A Paradise Too Far (Y’est où le paradis?)

As scriptwriter 
 1992 : My life
 1996 : The Escort
 2001 : Danny in the Sky
 2005 : Amnesia - The James Brighton Enigma
 2017 : A Paradise Too Far

As producer 
 1992 : My life
 1996 : The Escort
 2001 : Danny in the Sky
 2005 : Amnesia - The James Brighton Enigma

As actor 
 1993 : My life : Jeannot
 1996 : The Escort : Amant de Marco

As editor 
 1996 : The Escort
 2005 : Amnesia - The James Brighton Enigma

Awards and nominations

Awards 
Amnesia: The James Brighton Enigma was co-winner, with Tori Foster's documentary film 533 Statements, of the best Canadian feature film prize at the Inside Out Film and Video Festival in Toronto in 2006. It also got the best feature film public's prize in the Cine  Llamale H of Montevideo in Uruguay in 2008.
"A Paradise Too Far" wins best feature film at Picture This... Film Festival in Calgary 2018. It is also a semi-finalist for the Inclusivity Prize at Wayward Festival in Los Angeles 2018.

Nominations 
 2001 : Danny in the Sky was nominated in the category of "best music" for the Quebec cinema's Jutra price in 2005.
 2017 : A Paradise Too Far was nominated for the Zeno Mountain Award at the Miami Film Festival in 2017.

References

External links 
 
 Page du films du site web du producteur Les productions Castor & Pollux

Film directors from Quebec
Canadian male screenwriters
Film producers from Quebec
People from Longueuil
Writers from Quebec
Canadian LGBT screenwriters
LGBT film directors
LGBT producers
Canadian gay writers
Living people
Year of birth missing (living people)
21st-century Canadian LGBT people
21st-century Canadian screenwriters
21st-century Canadian male writers
Gay screenwriters